Valentin Savvich Pikul (July 13, 1928 – July 16, 1990) was a popular and prolific Soviet historical novelist of Ukrainian-Russian heritage. He lived and worked in Riga.

Pikul's novels were grounded in extensive research, blending historical and fictional characters and often focusing on Russian nationalistic themes.  Pikul's best-selling 1978 novel At the Last Frontier was a dramatized telling of Rasputin's influence over the Russian imperial court. Richard Stites says he was "a name hardly known to literary scholars but the most widely read author in the Soviet Union from the seventies to today [i.e., 1991]... Pikul's works were wildly popular: more than 20 million copies were sold in his lifetime .

Little of Pikul's work has been translated into English.  In May 2001 a seagoing minesweeper of the Black Sea Fleet was named in his honor.

Works 

 Ocean patrol, (Океанский патруль), 1954
 Bajazet, (Баязет), 1961
 Tares, (Плевелы), 1962
 Paris for three hours, (Париж на три часа), 1962
 On the outskirts of a great empire, (На задворках великой империи), 1964–66
 Out of the deadlock, (Из тупика), 1968
 The Requiem for Convoy PQ-17, (Реквием каравану PQ-17), 1970
 Moonzund, (Моонзунд), 1970 (screen version - Moonzund, 1987)
 By plume and sword, (Пером и шпагой), 1972
 Stars over the marsh, (Звёзды над болотом), 1972
 Boys with bows, (Мальчики с бантиками), 1974
 The Word and the Action, (Слово и дело), 1974–75
 The Battle of Iron Chancellors,(Битва железных канцлеров), 1977
 Riches, (Богатство), 1977
 The Demonic Forces, (Нечистая сила), 1979
 The Three Ages of Okini-San, (Три возраста Окини-сан), 1981
 To each his own, (Каждому своё), 1983
 The Favorite, (Фаворит), 1984
 Cruisers, (Крейсера), 1985
 I have the honour, (Честь имею), 1986
 Hard Labor, (Каторга), 1986
 Go and sin no more, (Ступай и не греши), 1990
 Operation Barbarossa, (Барбаросса. Площадь павших борцов), 1990
 Arakcheevshina, (Аракчеевщина)
 Domini canes, (Псы господни)
 Janissary, (Янычары)
 Fat, dirty and corrupt, (Жирная, грязная и продажная)

Footnotes

1928 births
1990 deaths
20th-century Russian novelists
Russian male novelists
Soviet male writers
20th-century Russian male writers
Maritime writers
Writers from Saint Petersburg
Russian historical novelists
Soviet novelists